Boruszyn refers to the following places in Poland:

 Boruszyn, Greater Poland Voivodeship
 Boruszyn, Lubusz Voivodeship